Kordandeh (also Romanized as Kordāndeh, Khūrdandeh, Kurdandeh, and Kurdan-Dekh) is a village in Ilat-e Qaqazan-e Sharqi Rural District, Kuhin District, Qazvin County, Qazvin Province, Iran. At the 2006 census, its population was 92, in 22 families.This village is populated by Azerbaijani Turks.

References 

Populated places in Qazvin County